Gerald Kaufman (born June 14, 1932) is a former Democratic member of the Pennsylvania House of Representatives. Kaufman, from Squirrel Hill, served in the house for three terms, sat on committees working on issues of education, industrial development, health and welfare, and chaired the Welfare Subcommittee of the Appropriations Committee. During his time in the house, Kaufman was known as a "champion of liberal and consumer legislation."

References

Democratic Party members of the Pennsylvania House of Representatives
1932 births
Living people